Şahvələdli is a village and municipality in the Dashkasan Rayon of Azerbaijan. It has a population of 188.

References

Populated places in Dashkasan District